Trevor Briggs may refer to:
 Trevor Briggs (rugby league, born 1946), English rugby league player for Castleford
 Trevor Briggs (rugby league, born 1948), English rugby league player for Leeds, Bramley, Keighley and Batley